Lega Romagna, whose complete name is , is a regionalist political party active in Romagna, part of Emilia-Romagna region. The party was a "national" section of Lega Nord (LN) from 1991 to 2020, and has been the regional section of Lega per Salvini Premier (LSP) in Romagna since 2020.

The party's current leader is Andrea Liverani, who succeeded Jacopo Morrone in February 2020. Gianluca Pini, long-time party leader (1991–2015) and member of the Chamber of Deputies (2006–2018), is a nostalgic of the LN and a strong critic of the LSP.

The party has been a long proponent of the separation of Romagna from Emilia and, thus, the establishment of the Region of Romagna. For now it has campaigned with some success for the "return" of Romagnol municipalities of northern Marche to Romagna.

Recent history
In May 2012 Gianluca Pini, who was a staunch supporter of the new federal secretary Roberto Maroni, was re-elected national secretary with the support of 91% of party delegates during a national congress.

In the 2014 regional election the joint list of LNE and LNR obtained its best result so far in a regionwide election (19.4%).

In October 2015 Jacopo Morrone was elected secretary to succeed to Pini, who was later installed as president.

In the 2019 European Parliament election the party obtained 33.8%, its best result ever. In the 2020 Emilia-Romagna regional election LNE's Lucia Borgonzoni posed the strongest challenge so far to the dominant PD, but stopped at 43.6% and was defeated, while the League's list obtained 32.0%.

Popular support
Lega Nord was usually stronger in the outer provinces, both in Emilia and Romagna. In the 2019–2020 elections (European Parliament and Regional Council, respectively) it did better in the provinces of Piacenza (45.3% and 44.0%), Parma (38.8% and 36.5%), Ferrara (41.9% and 41.9%) and Rimini (36.5% and 34.5%).

The combined electoral results of Lega Nord Emilia and Lega Nord Romagna in Emilia-Romagna are shown in the tables below.

Leadership
Secretary: Corrado Metri (1991–1996), Stefano Fantinelli (1996–1999), Gianluca Pini (1999–2015), Jacopo Morrone (2015–2020), Andrea Liverani (commissioner, 2020–present)
President: unknown (1991–1996), Corrado Metri (1996–1999), Stefano Fantinelli (1999–2007), Mauro Monti (2007–2014), Beatrice Lamio (2014–2015), Marcello Naldini (2015), Gianluca Pini (2015–2020)

External links
Official website

References

1991 establishments in Italy
Federalist parties in Italy
Lega Nord
Political parties established in 1991
Political parties in Emilia-Romagna